California Points of Historical Interest are sites, buildings, features, or events that are of local (city or county) significance and have anthropological, cultural, military, political, architectural, economic, scientific or technical, religious, experimental, or other value. By contrast, California Historical Landmarks are buildings, structures, sites, or places in California with statewide historical significance that meet certain criteria.

Points of Historical Interest designated after December 1997 and recommended by the State Historical Resources Commission are listed in the California Register of Historical Resources.

No historical resource may be designated as both a Landmark and a Point. If a Point is subsequently granted status as a Landmark, the Point designation will be retired.

Criteria
To be eligible for designation as a Point of Historical Interest, a resource must meet at least one of the following criteria:
 The first, last, only, or most significant of its type within the local geographic region (City or County);
 Associated with an individual or group having a profound influence on the history of the local area; or
 A prototype of, or an outstanding example of, a period, style, architectural movement or construction or is one of the more notable works or the best surviving work in the local region of a pioneer architect, designer or master builder.

Selected points
Bob's Big Boy Restaurant of Burbank, California (est. 1949, designated 1993)
Confusion Hill (est. 1949, designated 2010)
Forest Theater (est. 1910)
Golden Bough Playhouse (est. 1952)
Highland Springs Ranch & Inn (est. 1884)
Moss Beach Distillery (est. 1927)
Old Santa Susana Stage Road
Virginia Robinson Gardens

See also
California Historical Landmark
List of California Historical Landmarks
California Register of Historical Resources

References

External links
Official website
California Historical Resources, including Points of Historical Interest

 Point of Historical Interest
 Point of Historical Interest